"Boo Thang" is a song by American rapper Verse Simmonds, featuring singer Kelly Rowland. It was released by Bu Vision, a label run by Akon's brother Bu Thiam, in association with Konvict Muzik and The Island Def Jam Music Group. "Boo Thang" peaked at No. 44 on both the Billboard Hot R&B/Hip-Hop Songs chart and the Hot R&B/Hip-Hop Airplay chart. The song was ultimately included on Simmonds' mixtape Sextape Chronicles 2.

Music video
A music video, directed by Gil Green, was released to accompany the single. Filmed in Miami, Florida, it features appearances by Rowland, Verse’s fellow Konvict Muzik member Akon, and stand-up comedian Lil Duval.

Track listing

Charts

Weekly charts

Release history

References 

2011 songs
2011 singles
Kelly Rowland songs
Songs written by Verse Simmonds